Armin Hary (born 22 March 1937) is a retired German sprinter who won the 1960 Olympic 100 meters dash. He was the first non-North American to win the event since Percy Williams of Canada took the gold medal in 1928, the first man to run 100 meters in 10.0 seconds and the last white man to establish a world record in 100 meters dash.

Running career
After playing football (soccer) in his youth, Hary switched to sprinting at age 16. Only a few years later, in 1958, he won his first international title when he came first in the 100 m and the 4 × 100 m at the European Championships. He was also one of the first track stars to be affected by the rivalry between Adidas and Puma; each of the two then-fledgling companies wanted the "world's fastest man" to wear its shoes. Rumors of cash payments were floated, but no evidence was ever found to support the claim.

In 1960 Hary set the world record, which was equaled 24 days later, but stood as a European record for eight years less one day.

That same year, at the Olympics, he achieved his greatest moment of fame. After a nerve-wracking number of near-starts, Hary sprinted to the gold medal in the 100 m dash with a time of 10.2 seconds.

In the final of the 4 × 100 m relay, Hary and his teammates appeared to have finished second behind the American team, but 15 minutes later the Americans had been disqualified for a faulty exchange. Germany's time, 39.5 seconds, equaled their own world record.

During his career Hary had multiple conflicts with the German Athletics Federation, which eventually suspended him. These conflicts and waning motivation to compete resulted in Hary's retirement from sport in the early 1960s.

Later life
In 1980 Hary was sentenced to 18 months in prison for abusing his real estate trader position and defrauding the Catholic Church of 3.2 million German marks. In 2000 he was selected as Germany's Runner of the Millennium. In 2011 he was inducted into the German Sports Hall of Fame.

References

External links 

 
 
 

1937 births
Living people
People from Saarbrücken (district)
German male sprinters
World record setters in athletics (track and field)
Athletes (track and field) at the 1960 Summer Olympics
Olympic athletes of the United Team of Germany
Olympic gold medalists for the United Team of Germany
European Athletics Championships medalists
Medalists at the 1960 Summer Olympics
Olympic gold medalists in athletics (track and field)
Sportspeople from Saarland